Cú Cherca mac Fáeláin (died 712) was a King of Osraige in modern County Kilkenny. He was the son of Fáelán mac Crundmaíl (died 660), a previous king. The dynasty that ruled over Osraige in the early Christian period was known as the Dál Birn. He ruled from 693 to 712.  The Irish annals mention only his death. His son Anmchad mac Con Cherca (died circa 761) was also King of Osraige.

Notes

References

 Annals of Ulster at CELT: Corpus of Electronic Texts at University College Cork
 Annals of Tigernach at CELT: Corpus of Electronic Texts at University College Cork
 Book of Leinster,Reges Ossairge at CELT: Corpus of Electronic Texts at University College Cork
 Genealogies from Rawlinson B 502, compiled by Donnchadh Ó Corráin at CELT: Corpus of Electronic Texts at University College Cork

External links
CELT: Corpus of Electronic Texts at University College Cork

Kings of Osraige
FitzPatrick dynasty
712 deaths
8th-century Irish monarchs
People from County Kilkenny
Year of birth unknown

Gaels